The O. Henry Hotel is a hotel in Greensboro, North Carolina. 

The O. Henry is named after American writer and Greensboro native William Sydney Porter, whose pen name was O. Henry. The original hotel building, which was located in downtown Greensboro, was built in 1919 on the corner of Bellemeade and North Elm Street. It was the first of Greensboro's modern hotels, and one of the largest deluxe hotels in North Carolina, having over 300 rooms. The original hotel was closed in the 1960s. It was demolished in 1979 and a new hotel building was built in the late 1990s two miles from the original location. The O. Henry is privately owned by Quaintance-Weaver Restaurants & Hotels. The O. Henry is home to the restaurant the Green Valley Grill.

References 

Hotels in Greensboro, North Carolina
Demolished buildings and structures in North Carolina
Buildings and structures demolished in 1979
Historic American Buildings Survey in North Carolina